The women's 70 kg judo competitions at the 2022 Commonwealth Games in Birmingham, England took place on August 3 at the Coventry Arena. A total of 7 competitors from 6 nations took part.

Results 
The draw is as follows:

Repechages

References

External links
 
 Results
 

W70
2022
Commonwealth W70